The Tumansky R-13 is a Soviet turbojet engine designed by Sergei Alekseevich Gavrilov.

Design and development
The Tumansky R-13 is a development of the successful Tumansky R-11 engine. It is a two-spool axial-flow turbojet featuring a new five-stage high-pressure compressor, new combustion chamber design to facilitate restarting the engine at high altitudes, new afterburner, and greater use of titanium components. It is used by MiG-21M, MF, SM, and SMT, and Sukhoi Su-15M and TM. R-13 is also built in China as LM WP13, and experienced similar fate like Tumansky R-11: originally, both were licensed to be built in China, but after the Sino-Soviet split all Soviet technical support was withdrawn and Chinese proceeded on their own.  Under the leadership of the general designer Jiang Hepu (江和甫), both R-11 and R-13 were successfully built in China.

The R-95 is a non-afterburning development of this engine used by initial versions of the Sukhoi Su-25 attack aircraft. It was subsequently replaced in production by the improved R-195, which produces 12 percent more thrust.

Specifications (R-13-300)

See also

References

Citations

Sources 

 Gunston, Bill. World Encyclopaedia of Aero Engines. Cambridge, England. Patrick Stephens Limited, 1989. .
 Braybrook, Roy. Soviet Combat Aircraft. London, England. Osprey Publishing Limited, 1991. .

External links
 R-13 on LeteckeMotory.cz (cs,sk)

Tumansky aircraft engines
1950s turbojet engines